Volckert Adriaanszoon Schram (Enkhuizen, c. 1620 – 7 June 1673) was a 17th-century Dutch admiral. His name was also spelled Volkert or Volkhard.

1620 births
1673 deaths
Dutch naval personnel of the Anglo-Dutch Wars
People from Enkhuizen